Microlechia iranica is a moth in the family Gelechiidae. It was described by Povolný in 1976. It is found in southern Iran.

The length of the forewings is 3.2-4.5 mm. The forewings are grey-whitish, sprinkled with greyish scales and two blackish stigmata in the centre of the wing and a third pre-tornal spot at the hind margin. The hindwings are dirty grey-whitish.

References

Microlechia
Moths described in 1976